The AT&T ESPN All-America Player is a joint marketing venture between AT&T and ESPN that allows fans to select college football's player of the week and player of the year respectively. Each "vote" counts as an entry into an AT&T sweepstakes, usually for a trip to the BCS National Championship game. According to a press release, AT&T does not "divulge or confirm the number of votes". AT&T and ESPN share the revenue generated from the promotion. The award was previously known as the Cingular All-America Player before AT&T acquired Cingular.

All-America Player of the Year winners

All-America Player of the Week winners

2011

2010

2009

2008

2007

2006

2005

2004

References

External links
 AT&T ESPN All-America Player homepage
 2006 press release for All-America Player of Year

College football national player awards